Nigel Moore (born 4 January 1992 in Tockwith, England) is a British racing driver.

Career
Moore began his racing career in karting, in which he competed until 2007, when he began racing in the Ginetta Junior Championship, which he won with eight victories. He graduated to the Ginetta G50 Cup for 2008, which he also won. He also took two GT4 class wins in the British GT Championship racing a Ginetta G50.

He raced in the series full-time in 2009. His co-driver Jody Firth won the title, due to Moore missing the Knockhill round as he was racing at the 24 Hours of Le Mans with Ginetta. At 17, he became the youngest Briton to race at the legendary race. He also raced in four races of the GT4 European Cup, winning once.

For 2010, Moore moved into single-seater racing in the Formula Palmer Audi championship. He won the title, along with a prize Formula Two scholarship. He was also shortlisted for the 2010 McLaren BRDC Young Driver of the Year award.

After leaving school in the summer of 2008, Moore started working at Ginetta, but was sacked from the company in December 2010.

In 2016, Nigel Moore and Phil Hanson drove an Audi R8 LMS to victory in the 2016 Dunlop Endurance Championship.

Nigel's younger brother and sister, Edward and Sarah, also race in Britcar. They both made their debut in the Endurance championship in 2017, Ed driving a Ginetta G50 run by Tockwith Motorsport and Sarah driving a Smart ForFour.

Racing record

Career summary

Complete Ginetta Junior Championship results
(key) (Races in bold indicate pole position – 1 point awarded just in first race; races in italics indicate fastest lap – 1 point awarded all races;-

Complete Ginetta G50 Cup results
(key) (Races in bold indicate pole position – 1 point awarded just in first race; races in italics indicate fastest lap – 1 point awarded all races;-

Complete British GT results
(key) (Races in bold indicate pole position in class) (Races in italics indicate fastest lap in class)

Complete 24 Hours of Le Mans results

Complete Britcar results
(key) (Races in bold indicate pole position in class – 1 point awarded just in first race; races in italics indicate fastest lap in class – 1 point awarded all races;-

Complete European Le Mans Series results

References

Living people
1992 births
People from the Borough of Harrogate
English racing drivers
24 Hours of Le Mans drivers
British GT Championship drivers
Formula Palmer Audi drivers
Racing drivers from Yorkshire
European Le Mans Series drivers
Asian Le Mans Series drivers
Britcar drivers
Britcar 24-hour drivers
Ginetta GT4 Supercup drivers
Ginetta Junior Championship drivers
Le Mans Cup drivers
GT4 European Series drivers